The Van's Aircraft RV-10 is a four-seat, single-engine, low-wing homebuilt airplane sold in kit form by Van's Aircraft. It is the first four-seat airplane in the popular RV series. The RV-10 first flew on 29 May 2003, and the first kit parts were delivered to a customer in September 2003.

As of November 2022, 1,010 RV-10s have been completed and flown.

Design and development

The architect of the line of Van's aircraft, Richard VanGrunsven, designed the RV-10 to satisfy a market demand for a four-seat version of the popular RV series aircraft. The RV-10 was designed from the start as a touring aircraft and as such it forgoes the aerobatic capabilities and the lighter handling common to the aircraft in the RV line from the RV-3 to RV-8. Instead the RV-10 design focuses on greater stability and payload.

When Van's introduced the RV-10 they planned three engine configurations. One configuration using a smaller lighter 210 HP Continental IO-360ES, and two others using the larger 235 and 260HP Lycoming I/O-540. The #1 factory demonstrator used the IO-540, while the #2 RV-10 used the Continental IO-360. Vans decided to discontinue the support for the Continental engine after a poll which indicated that most builders would install the Lycoming engine, although this poses problems for builders in certain countries with engine displacement limitations, in which the Continental's 360 cubic inch displacement would be acceptable.

This is the first aircraft in the RV line that does not have a hinged or sliding canopy. VanGrunsven instead opted for two gull-winged doors to provide access to the four seats.

This design has benefited from many of the production changes that were pioneered with the RV-7, RV-8 and the RV-9. Like those aircraft, the RV-10 uses computer assisted design to produce a kit with pre-drilled rivet holes, thus greatly reducing assembly time for the builder. The RV-10 is available only as a tricycle landing gear version and no tailwheel or retractable landing gear versions are planned.

The aircraft is constructed of aluminum with the cabin structure and gull-winged doors made from composite materials. The landing gear is tubular steel with the nosewheel mounting tube welded to the engine mount. As in all nose-wheel equipped RV aircraft, the nosewheel is free castering and the aircraft is steered with differential braking. The brakes are mounted conventionally on the rudder pedal toes.

The amount of time and effort required to build the airplane can vary greatly, but Vans claims that the average first-time builder can complete it in 2,000 hours.

In February 2019 BRS Aerospace released a kit to install a ballistic parachute on the RV-10. The kit can be installed on a completed RV-10 or one under construction. The parachute takes up one third of the aircraft's baggage bay and weighs .

Variants
Aircraft Turbine Solution Group PBS TP-100 RV-10
The RV-10 was selected as the testbed aircraft for the Diemech TP 100  turboprop engine, which first flew on 8 June 2014.

Specifications (RV-10)

See also

References

External links

 

Homebuilt aircraft
2000s United States civil utility aircraft
RV-10
Low-wing aircraft
Single-engined tractor aircraft
Aircraft first flown in 2003